Atos Kasimir Wirtanen (27 January 1906 in Saltvik – 10 March 1979) was a Finnish left-wing intellectual, journalist, member of Finnish parliament (1936–1953) and cultural critic. He was born in Saltvik, Åland.

Wirtanen entered parliament on the Social Democratic Party of Finland (SDP) list at the 1936 election.  An opponent of fascism, in 1938 in response to the events of Kristallnacht, he likened Nazism's antisemitism with the Finnish far-right's hatred of Swedish-speaking Finns.  During the Continuation War, he was among the signatories of the "Petition of the Thirty-Three", members of the peace opposition who sought peace with the Soviet Union, his actions forcing him to spend a period underground.   Following the war, he joined to the Finnish People's Democratic League (SKDL) in 1946. Wirtanen was also active in the Socialist Unity Party (SYP) and served as its chairman from 1948 to 1955. In 1955 he led the SYP out of the SKDL. Wirtanen was fired twice (1941 and 1947) from the publication Arbetarbladet and once (1953) from the magazine Ny Tid. 

Wirtanen was a close friend and lover of the author Tove Jansson and a model for the Snufkin character, whose green hat is borrowed from Wirtanen. The first Moomin comic strips were published in October 1947 in Ny Tid. The series had to stop earlier than planned, as readers criticized it and especially the Moominpappa character for his bourgeois sympathies.

Wirtanen published two memoirs: Mot mörka makter (Against Dark Forces) and Poliittiset muistelmat (Political Memoirs). He also published several collections of aphorisms and other literary works.

Wirtanen married dance artist Irja Hagfors in 1954. He died in 1979 in Helsinki.

References 

1906 births
1979 deaths
People from Saltvik
People from Turku and Pori Province (Grand Duchy of Finland)
Swedish-speaking Finns
Social Democratic Party of Finland politicians
Socialist Unity Party (Finland) politicians
Finnish People's Democratic League politicians
Members of the Parliament of Finland (1936–39)
Members of the Parliament of Finland (1939–45)
Members of the Parliament of Finland (1945–48)
Members of the Parliament of Finland (1948–51)
Members of the Parliament of Finland (1951–54)
Finnish people of World War II
20th-century Finnish journalists